Sean Reinert (May 27, 1971 – January 24, 2020) was an American musician. He was the drummer for the rock band Æon Spoke and the drummer and founding member of the progressive metal band Cynic until leaving the band in September 2015. Reinert credited Kenny Clarke, John Bonham, Neil Peart, Gary Husband and Vinnie Colaiuta as being important influences during his formative years.

Life 
In 1991, Reinert and Paul Masvidal (also of Cynic) joined the band Death to record the Human album. This album is seen by many as the start of the technical death metal genre. After touring with Death, he returned to Cynic.

1993 saw the release of Focus (regarded as a landmark release in the field of technical/progressive metal) on the Roadrunner Records label. Roadrunner re-released it in 2005 as a special collector's edition due to high demand. After Cynic's disbandment Reinert had been a member of the Cynic spin-off band Portal which released a demo but eventually disbanded.  Having relocated to Los Angeles, Reinert continued working with music by writing and performing for television shows and motion pictures.

In 1999, Reinert helped form Æon Spoke alongside Masvidal, which is described as an "ethereal rock" band. The band saw releases in 2004 and 2007, receiving national and satellite airplay, performing, hosting radio appearances, and even appearing on television show and motion picture soundtracks.

During this time in 2006, it was announced that Cynic would reform for a tour which took place in the summer of 2007.  The reformed lineup then recorded a follow-up to Focus entitled Traced in Air, which was released in 2008 and followed by more touring.  In 2009, a new EP with Cynic was recorded scheduled for release in May 2010.

As of May 2014, he publicly revealed his homosexuality along with fellow Cynic member Paul Masvidal.

Reinert died on January 24, 2020, due to an aortic rupture.

Legacy 
Many artists have cited Reinert as an influence, including Peter Wildoer of Darkane,<ref>{{cite web|access-date=July 18, 2017|quote=[...] The three most important death metal albums to me are Atheist Piece of time,' Death '''Human,' and, a bit later, Cynic Focus'. These three records changed me, fundamentally. [...] I guess the biggest impact on me ever was when I saw 'Lack of Comprehension' with Death on MTV's Headbangers Ball some weeks before the album was released. When the part came where you can see Sean Reinert – to me the best contemporary metal drummer ever – from above playing the ride cymbal, hi hat bell, and double bass drums at the same time, I was so blown away by that sound that I watched it probably a hundred times that day, because I had recorded it on VHS. Since that day, I've been using that ride/bell sound a lot, ha ha! [...] | url = http://www.onlinedrummer.com/articles/peter-wildoer-exclusive-interview/|title=Peter Wildoer – Exclusive Interview|publication-date=March 22, 2009|first=Frank|last=Bender|website=www.onlinedrummer.com|url-status=live|archive-url=https://web.archive.org/web/20120716061623/http://www.onlinedrummer.com/articles/peter-wildoer-exclusive-interview/|archive-date=July 16, 2012}}</ref> Brann Dailor of Mastodon, Gene Hoglan, Richard Christy, Dirk Verbeuren of Soilwork and Megadeth, Chris Pennie of The Dillinger Escape Plan and Coheed and Cambria, George Kollias of Nile, John Merryman of Cephalic Carnage, Daniel Moilanen of Katatonia, Elliot Hoffman of Car Bomb, and Evan Sammons of Last Chance to Reason.

In addition, other artists have been quoted expressing admiration for his work including Hannes Grossmann, Kai Hahto of Nightwish, Dan Presland of Ne Obliviscaris, and Danny Walker of Intronaut.

 Discography 

Cynic
 Focus (1993)
 Traced in Air (2008)
 Re-Traced (2010)
 Carbon-Based Anatomy (2011)
 The Portal Tapes (2012)
 Kindly Bent to Free Us (2014)
Other
 Death − Human (1991)
 Sean Malone − Cortlandt (1996)
 Gordian Knot − Gordian Knot (1999)
 Gordian Knot − Emergent (2003)
 Aghora − Aghora (2000)
 Aghora − Formless (2006)
 Æon Spoke − Above the Buried Cry (2004)
 Æon Spoke − Æon Spoke (2007)
 Anomaly – Anomaly (1998)
 C-187 − Collision (2007)
 Levi/Werstler – Avalanche of Worms (2010)
 Sylencer – A Lethal Dose of Truth (2012) (guest drummer on "Acquiesce")
Hassan Iqbal – Of the Sky (2020)
 Amahiru – Amahiru'' (2020) (guest drummer on "Bringing Me Down (Alternative Version)")

References

External links 

 Official website
 Official Facebook page
 Death + Sean Reinert Drum Cam – Flattening of Emotions 10.26.91

1971 births
2020 deaths
Death (metal band) members
American heavy metal drummers
Place of birth missing
American gay musicians
LGBT people from Florida
Gay songwriters
20th-century American drummers
American male drummers
American LGBT songwriters
Æon Spoke members
Aghora (band) members
Cynic (band) members
21st-century American drummers
20th-century American male musicians
21st-century American male musicians
20th-century LGBT people
21st-century LGBT people
Gordian Knot (band) members